David Matthew Bingham (born October 19, 1989) is an American professional soccer player who plays as a goalkeeper for Major League Soccer club Portland Timbers.

Youth
David Bingham was born October 19, 1989 in Castro Valley, California to his parents Greg and Lisa Bingham. Bingham played for the youth club, Mustang United based out of Danville, California. In 2007, his club team made it to the Super- Y league National Championships. Bingham was a member of the Super-Y national team in 2006 and 2007. He had 13 shutouts and had a 0.60 goals against average during his senior year in high school. Bingham was a member of both the Bay Areas All-Area team as well as the all Tri-Valley team's first selection.

Career

College
Bingham played his college career at the University of California, Berkeley between the years of 2008 and 2010. Bingham led the Golden Bears to the quarterfinals of the NCAA Tournament in 2010, where they fell to eventual NCAA Champion Akron Zips on penalties. In 2009, Bingham earned himself All-Pac-10 second team honors and posted a 0.95 goals against average. The majority of his 2008 year was spent as backup to Stefan Frei.

Professional

Bingham signed a Generation Adidas contract with Major League Soccer soon after the 2011 MLS SuperDraft. Due to signing post-SuperDraft, Bingham was allocated to an MLS team via a weighted lottery. He was awarded to San Jose Earthquakes, the team he supported as a boy, on January 26, 2011.

He scored a goal on a 90-yard clearance from his own penalty box on July 13, 2011 against West Bromwich Albion in an exhibition match at Buck Shaw Stadium.

After spending time on loan with the San Antonio Scorpions and Strømmen IF, Bingham emerged as a starter for the Earthquakes during the 2015 season.

Bingham was traded to the LA Galaxy on December 18, 2017.

On January 13, 2022, after a year without a club, Bingham signed a two-year deal with Portland Timbers.

International
Bingham made his debut with the United States national team on February 5, 2016 against Canada, playing the full match and keeping a clean sheet in a 1-0 victory.

Career statistics

Personal
Bingham has one sister, Kimberly Bingham, who played goalkeeper at Arizona State University and later for the U.S. Women's National Soccer Team.

References

External links
 
 

1989 births
Living people
Norwegian First Division players
American expatriate soccer players
American soccer players
Association football goalkeepers
California Golden Bears men's soccer players
Expatriate footballers in Norway
LA Galaxy players
Major League Soccer players
North American Soccer League players
People from Castro Valley, California
People from Pleasanton, California
Portland Timbers players
San Antonio Scorpions players
San Jose Earthquakes players
Soccer players from California
Sportspeople from Castro Valley, California
Strømmen IF players
United States men's international soccer players